Ideological−Political Organization or Bureau of NAJA (Aghidati-Siasi) is one of three virtually independent hierarchical systems inside Law Enforcement Force of Islamic Republic of Iran, alongside its Command system (led by the Chief Police Commander) and the Intelligence Protection Organization. Director of the organization is directly appointed by the Supreme Leader of Iran. The Ideological−Political organizations of Iranian armed forces are taught to indoctrinate the personnel with Islamic and political training aligned with the Supreme Leader's guidelines. The organization is supervised by clerics.

References 

Law enforcement in Iran